WASA-LD, virtual channel 24 (VHF digital channel 13), is a low-power Estrella TV-owned-and-operated television station licensed to Port Jervis, New York, United States and serving the New York City media market. The station is owned by Estrella Media, and its transmitter is located at 4 Times Square in Manhattan.

WASA briefly used virtual channel 64 to match its former analog channel number, then later changed its virtual channel to 24.  It does not use its actual digital TV channel assignment on the air, because WNYE-TV calls itself Channel 25, its long-time analog channel number. WNYE-TV's digital channel is actually 24.

In April 2009, Venture Technologies, owner of WASA-LD, said it would sell the station to Burbank, California-based Liberman Broadcasting (which was renamed Estrella Media in February 2020, following a corporate reorganization of the company under private equity firm HPS Investment Partners, LLC) for $6 million, making New York the sixth market served by Liberman. The deal closed on March 1, 2010.

History

As W64AA
In the 1970s, the station signed on using UHF channel 64 as W64AA.  The original owner was Metromedia.  It was one of several television translators in New York City which operated at the upper end of the UHF television band in order to provide reliable coverage to sections of New York where reception was compromised by construction of the World Trade Center. This translator station relayed WNEW-TV (now WNYW), which at the time operated over VHF channel 5.

Originally, most New York City television stations operated their main transmitters from the Empire State Building. However, reliable reception was compromised for some viewers once the majority of the World Trade Center was constructed, thus necessitating the use of the UHF translators. In response, nearly all of the TV stations, including WNEW-TV, relocated to the North Tower of the World Trade Center in 1975.

In 1982, UHF channels 70 through 83 were decommissioned for use as television stations, and the frequencies were reassigned for the Advanced Mobile Phone System, an analog mobile phone system standard developed by Bell Labs which was officially introduced in the Americas in 1983.  TV stations operating on these channels were either switched to other broadcast channels, sold, or deleted, depending on the owners' intentions.

While some stations, such as WPIX and WCBS-TV, continued broadcasting over relay translators by moving to lower channels, WNEW-TV ultimately decide to shut down channel 64. The allocation remained inactive for eighteen years, until channel 11 WPIX temporarily used channel 64 as a translator station in 2001, following the September 11 attacks. Within a few weeks, WPIX service over channel 11 was fully restored. The channel 64 allocation was once again deleted by the end of 2001.

Infomercials and Chinese programming
Two years later, W64CW was signed on over UHF channel 64 on January 30, 2003, by Venture Technologies. It originally operated with 30 watts, and its transmitter was located at a site just west of downtown Port Jervis, at the triangle where New York, New Jersey, and Pennsylvania meet. The call sign was changed on January 12, 2007, to WASA-LP. The station had planned to carry Estrella TV in September 2008, but that network was picked up instead by a subchannel of WPIX.

WASA had a problem: it appeared its signal would go off the air every few minutes and then turn back on, resulting in a tear-down pixelation visual effect. This was corrected when the station dropped the NYC Slideshow video airing on Virtual 64.2 since its DTV inception in favor of two new subchannels promoting a launch of English and Chinese feeds of ICN (Information Culture News) Channel.

Originally, WASA aired a looping rotation of five half-hour infomercials running 24 hours a day on its primary channel. Technically, the five shows each interspersed with the legal station ID were recorded on one DVD and played on a Philips DVD player (whose screensaver is seen when the loop ends and is not restarted). The infomercials included Nu-Wave Oven, TriVita Super B-12, Sweet Soul of the '70s, Montel William's Living Well Health Master Blender, and The H2O Ultra Steam Mop. This looping rotation was ceased in January 2011. On April 22, 2011, the looping infomercial programming was restored.

Digital television

Digital channels

Analog-to-digital conversion
As a low-power station, WASA-LP was not required to turn off its analog signal on June 12, 2009, which was the end of the digital TV conversion period for full-service stations.

WASA-LP has since built its digital transmitter, and flash-cut its operations on digital channel 25 in 2010. The station is broadcasting from the Condé Nast Building in Manhattan, with its call sign changed to WASA-LD.

References

External links 
WASA-LD official website

Television channels and stations established in 2003
Low-power television stations in the United States
Estrella Media stations
ASA-LD